The common dwarf mongoose (Helogale parvula) is a mongoose species native to Angola, northern Namibia, KwaZulu-Natal in South Africa, Zambia and East Africa. It is part of the genus Helogale, along with the Ethiopian dwarf mongoose.

Characteristics
The common dwarf mongoose has soft fur ranging from yellowish red to very dark brown. It has a large pointed head, small ears, a long tail, short limbs and long claws.

Distribution and habitat

The common dwarf mongoose ranges from East to southern Central Africa, from Eritrea and Ethiopia to the provinces of Limpopo and Mpumalanga in the Republic of South Africa. It is especially common in areas with many termite mounds, its favorite sleeping place. It avoids dense forests and deserts.

The common dwarf mongoose is important in the ecosystem as a seed disperser and a predator of pests.

Subspecies
Helogale parvula parvula
Helogale parvula ivori
Helogale parvula mimetra
Helogale parvula nero
Helogale parvula ruficeps
Helogale parvula undulatus
Helogale parvula varia

Behaviour and ecology

The common dwarf mongoose is a diurnal animal. It is a highly social species that lives in extended family groups of two to thirty animals. There is a strict hierarchy among same-sexed animals within a group, headed by the dominant pair (normally the oldest group members). All group members cooperate in helping to rear the pups and in guarding the group from predators.

Young mongooses attain sexual maturity by one year of age but delay dispersal, with males usually emigrating (in the company of their brothers) at 2–3 years old. Dispersing males may join other established groups, either as subordinates or by ousting the resident males, or they may found new groups with unrelated dispersing females. In contrast, females normally remain in their home group for life, queuing for the dominant position. They will, however, emigrate to found a new group if they lose their place in the hierarchy to a younger sister.
 
Dwarf mongooses are territorial, and each group uses an area of approximately 30-60 hectares (depending on the type of habitat). They sleep at night in disused termite mounds, although they occasionally use piles of stones, hollow trees, etc. The mongooses mark their territory with anal gland and cheek gland secretions and latrines. Territories often overlap slightly, which can lead to confrontations between different groups, with the larger group tending to win.

Dwarf mongooses tend to breed during the wet season, between October and April, raising up to three litters. Usually only the group's dominant female becomes pregnant, and she is responsible for 80% of the pups reared by the group. If conditions are good, subordinate females may also become pregnant, but their pups rarely survive. After the gestation period of 53 days, 4-6 young are born. They remain below ground within a termite mound for the first 2–3 weeks. Normally one or more members of the group stay behind to babysit while the group goes foraging. Subordinate females often produce milk to feed the dominant female's pups. At 4 weeks of age the pups begin accompanying the group. All group members help to provide them with prey items until they are around 10 weeks old.

A mutualistic relationship has evolved between the dwarf mongoose and hornbills, in which hornbills seek out the mongooses in order for the two species to forage together, and to warn each other of nearby birds of prey and other predators.

Diet
The diet of the common dwarf mongoose consists of insects (mainly beetle larvae, termites, grasshoppers and crickets), spiders, scorpions, small lizards, snakes, small birds, and rodents, and is supplemented very occasionally with berries.

Publications
 Anne Rasa: Mongoose Watch: A Family Observed, John Murray, 1985, .
 Anne Rasa: Intra-familial sexual repression in the dwarf mongoose (Helogale parvula) in Naturwissenschaften, Volume 60, Number 6, p. 303-304, Springer, 1973.

References

common dwarf mongoose
Mammals of Sub-Saharan Africa
Mammals of Angola
Mammals of Botswana
Mammals of the Democratic Republic of the Congo
Mammals of Ethiopia
Mammals of West Africa
Mammals of Kenya
Mammals of Malawi
Mammals of Mozambique
Mammals of Namibia
Mammals of Somalia
Mammals of South Africa
Mammals of South Sudan
Mammals of Eswatini
Mammals of Tanzania
Mammals of Uganda
Mammals of Zambia
common dwarf mongoose